Saurabh 'Sunny' Verma (born 4 November 1981) is an Indian born American cricketer. Verma is a right-handed batsman who bowls leg break googly. Verma currently represents the United States national cricket team.

Verma made his debut for the United States in an unofficial Twenty20 against the UAE in a pre-tournament warm up match for the 2010 ICC World Twenty20 Qualifier. During the tournament Verma made his full Twenty20 debut against Scotland, where the USA went on to win by 6 wickets. He followed this up by playing a match against Ireland, which the United States lost.

Later in February 2010, Verma represented the United States in the 2010 ICC World Cricket League Division Five, where he helped the United States gain promotion to the 2010 ICC World Cricket League Division Four in Italy. In June 2021, he was selected to take part in the Minor League Cricket tournament in the United States following the players' draft.

References

External links
Saurabh Verma at Cricinfo
Saurabh Verma at CricketArchive

1982 births
Living people
Cricketers from Bhopal
American cricketers
Indian emigrants to the United States
American sportspeople of Indian descent